William Rutson of Newby Wiske Hall and Nunnington Hall (17 October 1791 – 11 May 1867) was a merchant and landowner who served as Justice of the Peace, Deputy Lieutenant and High Sheriff of Yorkshire.

Early life
Rutson was born on the 17 October 1791 the son of William Rutson of Allerton Lodge and Liverpool and Frances Wrather, daughter of Simon Wrather. He was educated at Trinity College, Cambridge and was a Fellow Commoner during his time there.

Career
Rutson purchased Nunnington Hall in 1839 for £152,388 in order to be used as the family hunting lodge. He was also a partner in his father's business, Ewart Myers which had previously been known as Ewart Rutson, after his father. In 1851, Rutson was appointed High Sheriff of Yorkshire, following Octavius Vernon Harcourt of Swinton Park. Rutson was also appointed Justice of the Peace, Deputy Lieutenant.

Family life

Rutson married Charlotte Mary Ewart, daughter of William Ewart, his father's business partner on 17 February 1825.
 William Rutson, a Lieutenant in the 70th Regiment and died aged 21 in 26 May 1846.
 John Rutson, inherited Newby Wiske Hall and Nunnington Hall.
 Albert Osliff Rutson, Barrister, Politician and Fellow of Magdalen College, Oxford.

Rutson died on 11 May 1867, aged 75, leaving a fortune of over £120,000 and was succeeded by his second son, John who also served as Justice of the Peace and donated the important Rutson Collection of Musical Instruments to the Royal Academy of Music Museum.

References

External links
 William Rutson

1791 births
1867 deaths
British slave owners
Politicians from Liverpool
People from Liverpool
Alumni of Trinity College, Cambridge